Maltese-Serbian relations are foreign relations between Malta and Serbia. Both countries established diplomatic relations in 1964. Malta is represented in Serbia through a non-resident ambassador based in Valletta (in the Foreign Ministry). Serbia has an Embassy Office in Valletta.
Malta is an EU member and Serbia is an EU candidate.

History 

Relations between Maltese and Serbians took place in early history in the framework of the relations between their masters, the British and the Ottoman empire.

One of the first Maltese public figures of Serbian/Montenegrin descent was Giorgio Mitrovich (1795 – 1885), patriot and politician known for his role in the struggle for freedom of the press in Malta, whose homonym grandfather was a successful privateer originally from Venice-ruled Kotor who moved to Malta around 1770.

In 1918, a group of cadets and personnel of the Serbian army, on board of the SS Polynesien, was rescued to Malta and healed at Cottonera Hospital after the ship was sunk by a German torpedo.

During the Second World War, as during the first, Malta provided a rest and recuperation setting for British allies - in this case, Tito's Yugoslav partisans, led by Major Jerko Juricic, who set up a camp at Bingemma. While in Malta, the partisans (both male and female) could be trained by British experts in the use of both Ally as well as Axis weapons. At least one Yugoslav partisan died of his wounds in Malta, and was buried at the Military Cemetery.

In the late 1940s, Maltese emigrants left to Australia on board of the Yugoslav steamers S.S. Partizanka and S.S. Radnik.

Relations between newly independent Malta and socialist Yugoslavia during the Cold War were shaped by the Cold War context. Malta under socialist PM Dom Mintoff joined the Non-Aligned Movement, which had been launched by Tito. Economic cooperation was marked by the construction of a small factory on the island with Yugoslav capitals. In the early 1980s, Yugoslavia donated a ship to Malta, upon request of Mintoff.

During Mintoff's rule, marked by relations with Qaddafi's Libya, Yugoslavia was a rather warm ally of Malta, probably the main one in Europe. Future foreign minister Michael Frendo wrote his graduate thesis in 1977 on "Workers' self-management: A new concept of the legal structure of the enterprise in Malta and Yugoslavia".

Agreements
Malta signed its 12th bilateral double taxation agreement with Serbia on 9 September 2009. Foreign Affairs Minister of Malta, Tonio Borg signed two agreements with Serbia during a two-day visit in 2010 about readmission of people residing without authorisation.

Diasporas 

The Serbian community is one of the fastest-growing diasporas in Malta. Their number has steadily grown throughout the 2010s, and in 2017 - with 2,757 workers - Serbians were the second biggest non-EU foreign community on the islands after Libyans and just ahead of Filipinos. Though the actual number is probably bigger. Serbian citizens in Malta work in the tourist industry and often follow a seasonal migration pattern. Crime rates, hooliganism and integration matters of the Serbian community has also come to the attention of Maltese society. Few Serbian-Maltese have come to the fore in Maltese society too.

See also 
 Foreign relations of Malta
 Foreign relations of Serbia 
 Accession of Serbia to the European Union
 Malta–Yugoslavia relations
 Yugoslavia and the Non-Aligned Movement
 Malta and the Non-Aligned Movement

References

External links 
  Direction of the Maltese representation in Serbia
  Serbian Ministry of Foreign Affairs about relations with Malta

 

 
Serbia
Bilateral relations of Serbia